The Queen's Life Regiment was a Royal Danish Army infantry regiment. On 1 January 2001, it was amalgamated with the Prince's Life Regiment.

History
After the siege and storming of Copenhagen, on 16 October 1659, King Frederick III honored the regiment with the name "Queen's Life Regiment" for the regiment's courage.

The regiment was in foreign war service (mostly British) around 1700. It participated in the Great Nordic War and in the 1864 campaign, when it participated with particular energy and contempt for death in the defense of Dybøl on 18 April 1864. It was almost wiped out.

On 1 November 1961 the Field Lord's Regiment of Foot was merged into the Queen's Life Regiment.

On October 25, 1994 a tank platoon from the regiment's 3rd Tank Squadron/1st Battalion conducted Operation Amanda as part of UNPROFOR.

Structure
  1st battalion (I/DRLR), raised in 1961 and disbanded in 2000. Mechanized Infantry Battalion.
  Saff Company (Oldenborske)
  1st Armored Infantry Company (Livkompagniet)
  2nd Armored Infantry Company (Hans Schack)
  3rd Tank Squadron (Blyw wé)
  4th Motorised Infantry Company (Bernstorff)
  2nd battalion (II/DRLR), raised in 1961 and disbanded in 2000. Mechanized Infantry Battalion from 1979.
  Saff Company 
  1st Armored Infantry Company 
  2nd Armored Infantry Company 
  3rd Tank Squadron
  4th Motorised Infantry Company 
  3rd battalion (III/DRLR), raised in 1961 and disbanded in 2000. Mechanized Infantry Battalion 1991–1996.
  Saff Company 
  1st Infantry Company 
  2nd Infantry Company 
  3rd Infantry Company 
  4th battalion (IV/DRLR), raised in 1961 and disbanded in 2000. Mechanized Infantry Battalion 1991–1996.
  Saff Company 
  1st Infantry Company 
  2nd Infantry Company 
  3rd Infantry Company 
  5th battalion (V/DRLR), raised in 1990 and disbanded in 1996. 
  Saff Company 
  1st Infantry Company 
  2nd Infantry Company 
  3rd Infantry Company
  6th battalion (VI/DRLR), raised in 1990 and disbanded in 1996.
  Saff Company 
  1st Infantry Company 
  2nd Infantry Company 
  3rd Infantry Company
  2nd Staff Company/2nd Jutland Brigade. (1961-1976), transferred to Nørre jyske Artilleriregiment
  Tank destroyer Squadron/1st Territorial Region (1979-1983)
  LRRP Company. (1983-2000) Part of Jutland Division, from 1997 Danish Division

Names of the regiment

Standards

References
 Lærebog for Hærens Menige, Hærkommandoen, marts 1960

Danish Army regiments
Military units and formations established in 1675
Military units and formations disestablished in 1961